The Nor.Ca. Men's Handball Championship is the official competition for Men's national handball teams of North America and Caribbean. In addition to crowning the Nor.Ca. champions, the tournament also served as a qualifying tournament for the Pan American Handball Championship. Starting from the 2020 edition the tournament is a qualifying event for the IHF World Men's Handball Championship

Summary

Medal table

Participating nations

See also
 Nor.Ca. Women's Handball Championship
 Pan American Men's Handball Championship
 Handball at the Pan American Games

References

External links
NACHConf.info

 
North America and Caribbean Handball Confederation competitions